Tepidibacter mesophilus is a bacterium from the family Peptostreptococcaceae.

References

Bacteria described in 2012
Peptostreptococcaceae